The Royal Marine Hotel is a hotel located on Marine Parade in Hunters Quay, Argyll and Bute, Scotland. It is a Category B listed building, opened in 1890 after the original 1856 building, named Marine Hotel, was gutted by fire. Its architect was Glasgow's Thomas Lennox Watson. The new construction received royal patronage in 1872.

The building was also the home, between 1872 and the 1950s, of the Royal Clyde Yacht Club, which was founded in 1856.

The small, former post office at the hotel was built around 1888 as a telegraph office for receiving news and results of the various yacht races taking place off the bay. As of 2014 it was used as a coffee shop. The adjacent wall-set post box is a large 'A' size example, dating from the end of the reign of Queen Victoria. It has a canted rainguard over the opening and the raised V.R. insignia and crown.

The hotel stands across Marine Parade from the Western Ferries pier, with ferries running between Hunters Quay and McInroy's Point across the Firth of Clyde in Gourock.

Its restaurant is named the Kintyre Bar and Restaurant. There is also a bar named Ghillies Bar.

Gallery

References

External links
 
ROYAL MARINE HOTEL (INCLUDING LODGE, FORMER POST OFFICE, WALL POST BOX, BOUNDARY WALLS AND GATEPIERS) HUNTER'S QUAY, DUNOON - Historic Environment Scotland
Dunoon, Hunter's Quay, 251 Marine Parade, Royal Marine Hotel - Canmore.org.uk

Hotels in Argyll and Bute
Buildings and structures in Hunters Quay
Category B listed buildings in Argyll and Bute
Listed hotels in Scotland
1890 establishments in Scotland
Hotels established in 1856
Hotel buildings completed in 1890